Miss Sri Lanka Online is an annual online beauty pageant. Miss Sri Lanka Online primarily used Facebook to run the contest. It is said to be the world's first major online beauty pageant. The contest debuted in 2012. In 2019 the event got a new look with new sponsors and a more interactive website in 2019. The first event was streamed online live to a global audience on 6 December 2012.

Contest 

The national level pageant takes entries locally and from Sri Lankans living overseas. Applicants log onto a website which then directs them to the Facebook page where they can upload a photograph of themselves which will be judged. The best 50 contestants are then selected and the public votes ('Like' on Facebook) for their preferred contestant.

The top 25 candidates then provide three more photographs and a short video clip, which again will be voted for by the public. The finalists are judged by a panel. The finale where the winner is unveiled is an event streamed live globally online.

Judges 
The panel of judges have included: 
 Bollywood star Vivek Oberoi
 Bollywood, Tollywood and Kollywood actress Sameera Reddy
 Australia's Got Talent winner 2012 Andrew De Silva
 Actress and former Miss Sri Lanka for Miss World Yureni Noshika
 Brand Director for Seri Naturals Shayana Raat
 COO of Seri Naturals Malik Perera
 Director and Founder of Colombo Fashion Week Ajay Singh
 Celebrity hairstylist and founder of Chagall (Colombo-Sydney) Gerald Solomons
 Celebrity hairstylist and founder of Capello Salons Romesh Atapattu

Winners 
The winner of Miss Sri Lanka Online 2012 was Maria Alkasas. The 1st Runner up was Angela Richard. The 2nd Runner up was Karandza Fernando.

References

See also 

Beauty pageants in Sri Lanka
Recurring events established in 2012
Sri Lankan awards